Liberton High School is a secondary school in Liberton, in the south of Edinburgh, Scotland, which is located on Gilmerton Road. The school roll for the 2014–15 academic year was 610.

Liberton High School has had certain great achievements in sports, such as the undefeated girls hockey XI in 1970-71.

In football, they were the first Edinburgh school to win the Scottish Schools Secondary Shield, in 1966.

On 1 April 2014, a 12-year-old girl was killed when a wall collapsed in one of the school Physical Education department's changing rooms.

It was announced in December 2020 as part of a £80M funding in education that was announced by John Swinney as Deputy First Minister of Scotland that Liberton High School would be rebuilt to replace the original school.

Headteachers
John Jack (1959–1968)
Henry Phillip (1968–1985)
Joe Vettese (1985–1995)
Gwen Kinghorn (1995–2005)
Donald J. Macdonald (2005–2012)
Stephen Kelly (2012–2022)
Rob Greenaway (Acting Headteacher) (2022–2023)
Alison Humphreys (Acting Headteacher) (2023–Present)

Notable alumni

 Eamonn Bannon, retired footballer
 Eric Faulkner, member of The Bay City Rollers
 Bruce Hay, rugby union player (Member of British Lions)
 David Martin, MEP
 David Paton, musician 
 Iain Stirling, TV personality
 Allan Wells, Olympic sprint champion, Moscow 1980
 Bobby Ford (Scottish footballer), retired footballer
 Murray McDermott, retired footballer

Notable staff
 Roy Williamson, Scottish folk singer; member of The Corries; art teacher at the school

External links
 Liberton High School's page on Scottish Schools Online

References 

Secondary schools in Edinburgh
1959 establishments in Scotland
Educational institutions established in 1959